Richard Kahui (born 9 June 1985) is a former New Zealand rugby union player. He played for Western Force in Super Rugby AU. He played at centre and wing.

Career

Domestic
Kahui debuted for Waikato in the 2004 NPC. In 2006, he was the top try scorer for the Air New Zealand Cup, and was named the 'Air New Zealand Cup Player of the Year'.

Kahui made his Super Rugby debut in 2006 with the Highlanders. In 2007 he signed with the  where he remained for the duration of his playing career in New Zealand. In 2012, he was a part of the championship-winning Chiefs squad.

In 2013 it was announced that he signed with Toshiba Brave Lupus on a two-year deal, beginning with the 2013–14 Top League season.

International
In 2008 Kahui was also named as a member of the New Zealand All Blacks squad for the inbound tours to New Zealand. He made his All Blacks debut on 21 June 2008, starting at outside centre (13), and scored a try in New Zealand's 44–12 victory over England. He has shown his versatility by playing on the wing (14) in the All Blacks 2009 Bledisloe Cup victory over Australia. A six-month shoulder injury he incurred at the end of his 2009 Super 14 season with the Chiefs, prevented him from playing in the All Black side later in the year.

In 2010, Kahui returned to the All Blacks and was dynamic in the second test against Wales in Dunedin, where he scored a try from playing on the wing. The following week against South Africa, he was named as a reserve and came onto Eden Park in the second half also on the wing again.

At the 2011 Rugby World Cup he scored two tries in the tournament's opening game against Tonga, and another two against Japan. He was an integral part of New Zealand's World Cup winning side, starting several games, including every knockout match at left wing.

Japan
Kahui lived in Fuchu, Japan with Top League team Toshiba Brave Lupus under Australian coach Joe Barakat, with other New Zealand players Steven Bates and David Hill.

Western Force
On 14 July 2020, it was announced Kahui had signed for the Western Force who are competing in the Super Rugby AU competition.

Retirement 
Kahui retired from rugby at the end of the 2022 Super Rugby Pacific season.

References

External links

Statistics from Fox Sports

Richard Kahui Blog

1985 births
Living people
New Zealand rugby union players
Chiefs (rugby union) players
Highlanders (rugby union) players
Waikato rugby union players
Toshiba Brave Lupus Tokyo players
Rugby union centres
New Zealand international rugby union players
Rugby union players from Tokoroa
Ngāti Maniapoto people
New Zealand expatriate rugby union players
New Zealand expatriate sportspeople in Japan
Expatriate rugby union players in Japan
Rugby union wings
Māori All Blacks players
Western Force players
People educated at Forest View High School, Tokoroa